Henrietta Joy Abena Nyarko Mensa-Bonsu,  (born 29 October 1957) is a Supreme Court Judge of the Republic of Ghana. She was nominated by president Nana-Akufo-Addo. She is the 5th female member of the Court. Prior to her appointment to the Supreme Court, she was a Ghanaian law professor who served as a member of the United Nations Independent Panel On Peace Operations.

Early life and education
Mensa-Bonsu was born on 29 October 1957 in Kumasi. She attended Wesley Girls High School, University of Ghana and Yale University , obtaining a Master of Laws (LLM) in 1985.

Career
Mensa-Bonsu is a professor and senior law lecturer at the University of Ghana school of law. She became a full law lecturer at the University of Ghana in 2002, and in 2003 was elected as a fellow into the Ghana Academy of Arts and Sciences. She was elected President of the Academy in 2019.

She has used platforms available to her to advocate for peace to accelerate national development. She was the guest speaker at the Second Annual Peace Lecture put together by the Accra West chapter of the Rotary Club and the Institute for Democratic Governance (IDEG), where she spoke about the "need to nurture peace" without waiting "till the need arises for peace before we go for it". She delivered the 2014 University of Ghana Alumni Association lecture on the topic "The African Union’s Peace and Security Architecture: A guarantor of peace and security on the continent”.

In 2017, Mensa-Bonsu failed in her bid to be elected as a Judge of the International Criminal Court (ICC). She was a member of the Presidential Commission of Enquiry which probed the Ayawaso West Wuogon by-election violence. She is currently the president of the Ghana Academy of Arts and Sciences.

Supreme Court appointment
Mensa-Bonsu was nominated by Nana Addo Danquah Akufo-Addo, the President of Ghana, in May 2020 for consideration for appointment to the bench of the Supreme Court of Ghana.

Her name was submitted with other three judges by the president Nana-Akufo-Addo to Parliament for appointment into the Supreme Court bench. The others were Justice Clemence Jackson Honyenuga, Justice Issifu Omoro Tanko Amadu and Justice Emmanuel Yonny Kulendi. She was approved by the Parliament after she was recommended by the Appointment Committee. She was sworn into office by the President Nana Akufo-Addo.

Personal life
Mensa-Bonsu is married to Kwaku Mensa-Bonsu and they have three adult daughters, five grandchildren, three foster sons and three foster grandchildren.

See also
 Supreme Court of Ghana
 List of judges of the Supreme Court of Ghana
 Ghana Academy of Arts and Sciences

References

Living people
Ghanaian legal scholars
20th-century Ghanaian lawyers
20th-century Ghanaian educators
21st-century Ghanaian educators
21st-century Ghanaian lawyers
21st-century women lawyers
Justices of the Supreme Court of Ghana
Fellows of the Ghana Academy of Arts and Sciences
1957 births